Anand and Milind Srivastava are a duo of Indian film music composers. Born to composer Chitragupt, they have composed music for over 200 Bollywood films. The brothers debuted in 1984 with Ab Ayega Mazaa and had their major breakthrough with Qayamat se Qayamat Tak in 1988.

Career 
Anand and Milind wrote the score for Ab Ayega Mazaa (1984), Jalwa (1987), Qayamat Se Qayamat Tak (1988) and then for Baaghi: A Rebel For Love  (1990).

Discography

References

Filmfare Awards winners
Indian musical duos
Living people
Hindi film score composers
Telugu film score composers
Year of birth missing (living people)
Indian male film score composers